Farooq Zameer was a notable Pakistani actor. He died at the age of 76. He was awarded the Pride of Performance award in 2001.

Notable serials
Following are his notable serials:
Guriya
Shamail and Suragh-i-Zindagi
Mukmala Aur Mahira
Khandan-i-Shughlia
Tum Bhi Kaho
Kaghaz Ki Nao

References

1941 births
2017 deaths
Pakistani male television actors
People from Lahore
Recipients of the Pride of Performance